Mut Castle is a castle in Mut, Mersin Province, Turkey.

Geography 
Laal Pasha Mosque is to the east and intercity bus terminal is to the north east.

History 
The neighbourhood surrounding the castle during the Roman Empire was known as Claudiupolis. According to unconfirmed reports Claudiupolis may be even older than the Roman Empire (up to Hittites). Although the building date of the castle is unknown, it is known that the castle had been used during the Byzantine Empire period. In 1228 (?) the Karamanids (a Turkmen dynasty which controlled a part of Anatolia between the 13th and 15th centuries.) captured the castle and rebuilt it. (Mut was frequently used as a co-capital of Karamanids). In 1473, the castle was captured by the Ottoman Empire. During the reign of the Ottoman sultan Ahmet I (1603-1617) the castle was renovated .

Technical details 

The plan of the  castle is almost square. There are 9 bastions around the fortifications and a small cylindrical inner castle within the main castle. Face stone and rubble stone were used in the construction.

References 

Forts in Turkey
Mut District
Archaeological sites in Mersin Province, Turkey
Byzantine fortifications in Turkey
Castles in Mersin Province